The Legend Of Shelby The Swamp Man  is an American reality television series that premiered on August 6, 2013 on History as a spin-off to the series Ax Men. The program follows the life of Shelby Stanga when he's not logging. The reality show is about the life and times of Shelby Stanga getting into strange situations as he goes about his unique life style.

A list of the episodes in season 1 includes:
 "Air Shelby" (August 6, 2013)
 "Gator Head Gamble" (August 6, 2013)
 "Bad Juju" (August 13, 2013)
 "Swamp Rat Race" (August 13, 2013)
 "Reelin' in the Beers" (August 20, 2013)
 "The Swamptastic Journey" (August 20, 2013)
 "Swining & Dining" (August 27, 2013)
 "Turtle Soup Tonight!" (August 27, 2013)

Also, a Christmas episode of the show aired on December 3, 2013 ("A Very Shelby Christmas") and an episode recapping Shelby's funniest moments on Ax Men on August 6, 2013 ("Shelby's Greatest Hits Vol. 1").

Two episodes aired on April 26, 2015 at 10:00 pm following the season finale of Ax Men.

Reception
Common Sense Media rated the series as 3 stars out of 5.

References 

2010s American reality television series
2013 American television series debuts
2015 American television series endings
History (American TV channel) original programming
American television spin-offs
Reality television spin-offs